The Shizhuyuan mine is a large mine located in the south-eastern China in Hunan. Shizhuyuan represents one of the largest fluorite reserves in China having estimated reserves of 45.9 million tonnes of ore grading 21.7% fluorite.

References 

Fluorite mines in China